The Franchise Affair is a 1948 mystery novel by Josephine Tey about the investigation of a mother and daughter accused of kidnapping a local young woman. In 1990, the UK Crime Writers' Association named it one of The Top 100 Crime Novels of All Time.

Plot
Robert Blair, a local solicitor, is called on to defend two women, Marion Sharpe and her mother, who are accused of kidnapping and beating a fifteen-year-old war orphan named Betty Kane. Set in Milford, the novel opens with the Sharpes about to be interviewed by local police and Scotland Yard, represented by Inspector Alan Grant (who is the protagonist of five other Tey novels). Marion calls Blair and, although his firm does not do criminal cases, he agrees to come out to their home, "The Franchise", to look out for their interests during the questioning.

Betty's account is that during the Easter holidays, she went to stay with her aunt and uncle, the Tilsits, near Larborough. After a week, she wrote to her adoptive parents, the Wynns, to say she was enjoying herself and would spend another three weeks with the Tilsits. Then one evening, waiting for a bus, the Sharpe women approached her in their car and offered her a lift. They took her to the Franchise, demanded that she become a domestic worker, and, upon her refusal, imprisoned her in the attic. Betty alleges that they starved and beat her until she escaped.

When Blair meets Marion and Mrs. Sharpe, who are sensible and forthright, he believes them innocent, and he distrusts Betty. Yet Betty does have bruises from a beating, and she describes items and rooms inside the Franchise accurately.

Later in the week, a newspaper runs a long story from Betty's side, based on an interview with her vengeful brother, Leslie. Robert Blair now finds that the townspeople of Milford are mostly against the Sharpes. An exception is Stanley Peters, a local car mechanic and friend of Blair, who says that Betty reminds him of an ex-girlfriend who was promiscuous and deceitful.

As interest in the case builds over a few weeks, locals engage in overt hostility against the Sharpes: public snubbing, then graffiti on their walls, then smashing of the windows; the vandalism culminates when the Franchise is destroyed by arson. Stanley has become a friend and ally to the Sharpes, serving as a night guard for them along with his coworker Bill, and then providing them shelter when their home is burned down.

Blair is assisted in his search for clues against Betty Kane by his cousin, Nevil Bennet, who also works at the law firm, and his friend Kevin Macdermott, a flamboyant London barrister. Nevil's engagement to a local clergyman's daughter ends due to her belief in the Sharpes' guilt.

The clues that the investigators chiefly uncover are in the manner of character evidence, and Tey supplies a colourful variety. Examples include the facts that Betty has an eidetic memory; when Betty returns home after the alleged kidnapping, the only item she has with her is lipstick; she tells the Wynns about her abduction not right away, but in various details over a few days; Betty's mother was promiscuous, "a bad mother and a bad wife", according to a neighbour; Mrs. Tilsit, the aunt, tells Blair that Betty spent most of her holiday time not with her aunt and uncle, but in unsupervised freedom: going to the cinema, using buses, and eating lunch away from home; Betty had befriended a teenage girl who had once worked for the Sharpes as a cleaner, whom Betty had bullied. She is described by a couple of people as demure and looking as though "butter wouldn't melt in her mouth"; one of them, a restaurant waiter, tells Blair that Betty came in for tea several times, looking wholesome: "And then one day she picked up the man at the next table. You could have knocked me over with a feather."

Robert Blair, who has been a lifelong bachelor living with his woolly-minded Aunt Lin, becomes strongly attracted to Marion Sharpe, who is described as gypsy-ish (because of her dark hair, browned skin, and habit of wearing colourful scarves). Marion, who likes Blair, is however determined to remain single and stay with her sharp-tongued mother, who is her best friend. Nevil, although engaged, also finds Marion attractive; an aspiring poet, he describes her as "all compact of fire and metal. ... People don't marry women like Marion Sharpe, any more than they marry winds and clouds. Any more than they marry Joan of Arc."

The book maintains the suspense of the Sharpes' guilt or innocence for the first half, and then, when the reader feels certain they are innocent (though all the evidence points to them) the tension comes from how they will avoid being wrongfully incarcerated. Things go right down to the wire, with a lot of detailed investigative work paying off in a satisfying fashion at the trial.

Inspiration
Although given a contemporary (post-Second World War) setting, it is inspired by the 18th-century case of Elizabeth Canning, a maidservant who claimed she had been kidnapped and held prisoner for a month. It is most probably based on a reading of Arthur Machen's non-fiction account of the case The Canning Wonder (1925) as the plot follows a similar line to Machen's thinking.

Adaptations
The novel was adapted for the film The Franchise Affair in 1951, starring Michael Denison as Blair, Dulcie Gray as Marion Sharpe, Marjorie Fielding as Mrs. Sharpe, and Ann Stephens as Betty Kane. It has also been adapted twice for television, in 1962 and 1988, and once for radio in 2005.

The 1962 version featured Michael Aldridge as Blair, Rosalie Crutchley as Marion Sharpe, Meg Wynn Owen as Betty Kane, and Veronica Turleigh as Mrs. Sharpe.

The 1988 version starred Patrick Malahide as Blair, Joanna McCallum as Marion Sharpe, Rosalie Crutchley as Mrs. Sharpe, Kate Emma Davies as Betty Kane, Alex Jennings as Nevil Bennett, and Bryan Murray as Kevin Macdermott.

References

External links
 
The 1962 TV adaptation of 
The 1988 TV adaptation of 

1948 British novels
British novels adapted into films
Novels by Josephine Tey
Peter Davies books